Kamenec pod Vtáčnikom is a village and municipality in Prievidza District in the Trenčín Region of western Slovakia. It includes the former separate villages Horny Kamenec and Dolny Kamenec.

History
In historical records the village was first mentioned in 1355.

Geography
The municipality lies at an altitude of 275 metres and covers an area of 25.298 km2. It has a population of about 1861 people.

Genealogical resources

The records for genealogical research are available at the state archive "Statny Archiv in Nitra, Slovakia"

 Roman Catholic church records (births/marriages/deaths): 1777-1905 (parish A)
 Lutheran church records (births/marriages/deaths): 1735-1950 (parish B)

See also
 List of municipalities and towns in Slovakia

References

External links
 
 
 Surnames of living people in Kamenec pod Vtacnikom

Villages and municipalities in Prievidza District